Gustaf V (Oscar Gustaf Adolf; 16 June 1858 – 29 October 1950) was King of Sweden from 8 December 1907 until his death in 1950. He was the eldest son of King Oscar II of Sweden and Sophia of Nassau, a half-sister of Adolphe, Grand Duke of Luxembourg. Reigning from the death of his father Oscar II in 1907 to his own death nearly 43 years later, he holds the record of being the oldest monarch of Sweden and the third-longest rule, after Magnus IV (1319–1364) and Carl XVI Gustaf (1973–present). He was also the last Swedish monarch to exercise his royal prerogatives, which largely died with him, although they were formally abolished only with the remaking of the Swedish constitution in 1974. He was the first Swedish king since the High Middle Ages not to have a coronation and so never wore the king's crown, a practice that has continued ever since.

Gustaf's early reign saw the rise of parliamentary rule in Sweden although the leadup to World War I induced his dismissal of Liberal Prime Minister Karl Staaff in 1914, replacing him with his own figurehead, Hjalmar Hammarskjöld, the father of Dag Hammarskjöld, for most of the war. However, after the Liberals and Social Democrats secured a parliamentary majority under Staaff's successor, Nils Edén, he allowed Edén to form a new government which de facto stripped the monarchy of virtually all powers and enacted universal and equal suffrage, including for women, by 1919. Bowing to the principles of parliamentary democracy, he remained a popular figurehead for the remaining 31 years of his rule, although not completely without influence.  Gustaf V had pro-German and anti-Communist stances which were outwardly expressed during World War I and the Russian Civil War.  During World War II, he allegedly urged Per Albin Hansson's coalition government to accept requests from Nazi Germany for logistics support, arguing that refusing might provoke an invasion. His intervention remains controversial.  

An avid hunter and sportsman, Gustaf presided over the 1912 Olympic Games and chaired the Swedish Association of Sports from 1897 to 1907. Most notably, he represented Sweden (under the alias of Mr G.) as a competitive tennis player, keeping up competitive tennis until his 80s, when his eyesight deteriorated rapidly. He was succeeded by his son, Gustaf VI Adolf.

Early life

Gustaf V was born in Drottningholm Palace in Ekerö, Stockholm County, the son of Prince Oscar and Princess Sofia of Nassau. At birth Gustaf was created Duke of Värmland.  Upon his father's accession to the throne in 1872, Gustaf became crown prince of both Sweden and Norway. On 8 December 1907, he succeeded his father on the Swedish throne.

On 20 September 1881 he married Princess Victoria of Baden in Karlsruhe, Germany.

Public life

When he ascended the throne, Gustaf V was, at least on paper, a near-autocrat.  The 1809 Instrument of Government made the king both head of state and head of government, and ministers were solely responsible to him.  However, his father had been forced to accept a government chosen by the majority in Parliament in 1905. Since then, prime ministers had been de facto required to have the confidence of the Riksdag to stay in office.

Early in his reign, in 1910, Gustaf V refused to grant clemency to the convicted murderer Johan Alfred Ander, who thus became the last person to be executed in Sweden.

At first, Gustaf V seemed to be willing to accept parliamentary rule.  After the Liberals won a massive landslide in 1911, Gustaf appointed Liberal leader Karl Staaff as Prime Minister. However, during the runup to World War I, the elites objected to Staaff's defence policy. In February 1914, a large crowd of farmers gathered at the royal palace and demanded that the country's defences be strengthened.  In his reply, the so-called Courtyard Speech—which was actually written by explorer Sven Hedin, an ardent conservative—Gustaf promised to strengthen the country's defences.  Staaff was outraged, telling the king that parliamentary rule called for the Crown to stay out of partisan politics.  He was also angered that he had not been consulted in advance of the speech.  However, Gustaf retorted that he still had the right to "communicate freely with the Swedish people." The Staaff government resigned in protest, and Gustaf appointed a government of civil servants headed by Hjalmar Hammarskjöld (father of future UN Secretary-General Dag Hammarskjöld) in its place.

The 1917 elections showed a heavy gain for the Liberals and Social Democrats, who between them held a decisive majority. Despite this, Gustaf initially tried to appoint a Conservative government headed by Johan Widén.  However, Widén was unable to attract enough support for a coalition. It was now apparent that Gustaf could no longer appoint a government entirely of his own choosing, nor could he keep a government in office against the will of Parliament.  With no choice but to appoint a Liberal as prime minister, he appointed a Liberal-Social Democratic coalition government headed by Staaff's successor as Liberal leader, Nils Edén. The Edén government promptly arrogated most of the king's political powers to itself and enacted numerous reforms, most notably the institution of complete (male and female) universal suffrage in 1918–1919. While Gustaf still formally appointed the ministers, they now had to have the confidence of Parliament.  He was now also bound to act on the ministers' advice.  Although the provision in the Instrument of Government stating that "the King alone shall govern the realm" remained unchanged, the king was now bound by convention to exercise his powers through the ministers. Thus, for all intents and purposes, the ministers did the actual governing. While ministers were already legally responsible to the Riksdag under the Instrument of government, it was now understood that they were politically responsible to the Riksdag as well. Gustaf accepted his reduced role, and reigned for the rest of his life as a model limited constitutional monarch.  Parliamentarianism had become a de facto reality in Sweden, even if it would not be formalized until 1974, when a new Instrument of Government stripped the monarchy of even nominal political power.

Gustaf V was considered to have German sympathies during World War I. His political stance during the war was highly influenced by his wife, who felt a strong connection to her German homeland. On 18 December 1914, he sponsored a meeting in Malmö with the other two kings of Scandinavia to demonstrate unity. Another of Gustaf V's objectives was to dispel suspicions that he wanted to bring Sweden into the war on Germany's side.

Although effectively stripped of political power, Gustaf was not completely without influence. In 1938, for instance, he personally summoned the German ambassador to Sweden and told him that if Hitler attacked Czechoslovakia over its refusal to give up the Sudetenland, it would trigger a world war that Germany would almost certainly lose. Additionally, his long reign gave him great moral authority as a symbol of the nation's unity.

Alleged Nazi sympathies

Both the King and his grandson Prince Gustav Adolf socialized with Nazi leaders before World War II, though arguably for diplomatic purposes. Gustaf V attempted to convince Hitler during a visit to Berlin to soften his persecution of the Jews, according to historian Jörgen Weibull. He was also noted for appealing to the leader of Hungary to save its Jews "in the name of humanity."

When Nazi Germany invaded the Soviet Union in June 1941, Gustaf V tried to write a private letter to Hitler thanking him for taking care of the "Bolshevik pest" and congratulating him on his "already achieved victories". He was stopped from doing so by Prime Minister Per Albin Hansson.

During the war, Gustav invited Swedish Nazi leader Sven Olov Lindholm to Stockholm Palace. The Swedish king had friends in Lindholm's movement.

Midsummer crisis 1941
According to Prime Minister Hansson, during the Midsummer crisis, the King in a private conversation had threatened to abdicate if the government did not approve a German request to transfer a fighting infantry division, the so-called Engelbrecht Division, through Swedish territory from southern Norway to northern Finland in June 1941, around Midsummer. The accuracy of the claim is debated, and the King's intention, if he really made that threat, is sometimes alleged to be his desire to avoid conflict with Germany. The event has received considerable attention from Swedish historians and is known as midsommarkrisen, the Midsummer Crisis.

Confirmation of the King's action is contained in German Foreign Policy documents captured at the end of the war. On 25 June 1941, the German Minister in Stockholm sent a "Most Urgent-Top Secret" message to Berlin in which he stated that the King had just informed him that the transit of German troops would be allowed. He added: The King's words conveyed the joyful emotion he felt. He had lived through anxious days and had gone far in giving his personal support to the matter. He added confidentially that he had found it necessary to go so far as to mention his abdication.

Personal life

Gustaf V was thin, and known for his height. He wore pince-nez eyeglasses and sported a pointed mustache for most of his teen years.

Gustaf V was a devoted tennis player, appearing under the pseudonym Mr G. As a player and promoter of the sport, he was elected into the International Tennis Hall of Fame in 1980. The King learned the sport during a visit in Britain in 1876 and founded Sweden's first tennis club on his return home. In 1936 he founded the King's Club. During his reign, Gustaf was often seen playing on the Riviera. On a visit to Berlin, Gustaf went straight from a meeting with Hitler to a tennis match with the Jewish player Daniel Prenn. During World War II, he interceded to obtain better treatment for Davis Cup stars Jean Borotra of France and his personal trainer and friend Baron Gottfried von Cramm of Germany, who had been imprisoned by the Nazi Government on the charge of a homosexual relationship with a Jew.

Haijby affair
Allegations of a love affair between Gustav and Kurt Haijby led to the court paying 170,000 kronor under the threat of the blackmailing Haijby. That led to the so-called Haijby affair and several controversial trials and convictions against Haijby, which spawned considerable controversy about Gustav's alleged homosexuality.

In 2021 the alleged events surrounding the Haijby affair were adapted into a fictional miniseries for Sveriges Television called En Kunglig Affär (A Royal Secret), directed by Lisa James Larsson and written by Bengt Braskered.

Death
After a reign of nearly 43 years, King Gustaf V died in Stockholm of flu complications on 29 October 1950. His 67-year-old son Gustav succeeded him as Gustav VI Adolf.

Honours
National honours
 Knight and Commander of the Seraphim, 16 June 1858
 Knight of the Order of Charles XIII, 16 June 1858
 Commander Grand Cross of the Sword, 16 June 1858
 Commander Grand Cross of the Polar Star, 16 June 1858
 Commander Grand Cross of the Order of Vasa, 12 July 1886
 Honorary Member of the Johanniter Order

Foreign military ranks
 : General à la suite in the Royal Danish Army, 1909 
: Admiral à la suite in the Imperial Russian Navy, 1909
 : Honorary Admiral in the Royal Navy, 3 november 1908. 
 : General à la suite in the Imperial German Army, 1909
 : Admiral à la suite in the Imperial German Navy, 1909
 : Admiral à la suite in the Spanish Navy, 1928
 : Honorary commander of the third Life Grenadier Regiment "Königin Elisabeth", 1909

Foreign honours

Arms
Upon his creation as Duke of Värmland, Gustaf V was granted a coat of arms with the Arms of Värmland in base. Upon his accession to the throne, he assumed the Arms of Dominion of Sweden.

Issue

Swedish author Anders Lundebeck (1900–1976) allegedly was an extramarital son of King Gustaf V, an allegation purported by Lundebeck himself and to some extent supported by existing facts.

Ancestry

References

External links

 Gustaf V profile at the International Tennis Hall of Fame website
 
 
 

|-

|-

|-

|-

1858 births
1950 deaths
20th-century Swedish monarchs
People from Ekerö Municipality
Dukes of Värmland
House of Bernadotte
Swedish Lutherans
Swedish male tennis players
International Tennis Hall of Fame inductees
Uppsala University alumni
World War II political leaders
Swedish people of French descent
Swedish monarchs of German descent
Crown Princes of Sweden
Burials at Riddarholmen Church

Grand Masters of the Order of Charles XIII
Knights of the Order of Charles XIII
Commanders Grand Cross of the Order of the Sword
Commanders Grand Cross of the Order of the Polar Star
Grand Crosses of the Order of Vasa
Knights of the Order of the Norwegian Lion
Recipients of the Cross of Honour of the Order of the Dannebrog
Grand Commanders of the Order of the Dannebrog
Grand Crosses of the Order of Saint Stephen of Hungary
Knights of the Golden Fleece of Spain
Honorary Knights Grand Cross of the Order of the Bath
Extra Knights Companion of the Garter
Collars of the Order of the White Lion
Recipients of the Order of the Netherlands Lion
3
3
3
Recipients of the Order of the White Eagle (Russia)
Recipients of the Order of St. Anna, 1st class
Recipients of the Order of Propitious Clouds
Recipients of the Order of the White Star, 1st Class
Grand Crosses with Diamonds of the Order of the Sun of Peru
Sons of kings
Recipients of the Order of the White Eagle (Poland)
Grand Crosses of the Order of Saint-Charles
Recipients of orders, decorations, and medals of Ethiopia